A psychiatrist is a physician who specializes in psychiatry, the branch of medicine devoted to the diagnosis, prevention, study, and treatment of mental disorders. Psychiatrists are physicians and evaluate patients to determine whether their symptoms are the result of a physical illness, a combination of physical and mental ailments or strictly mental issues. Sometimes a psychiatrist works within a multi-disciplinary team, which may comprise clinical psychologists, social workers, occupational therapists, and nursing staff. Psychiatrists have broad training in a biopsychosocial approach to the assessment and management of mental illness.

As part of the clinical assessment process, psychiatrists may employ a mental status examination; a physical examination; brain imaging such as a computerized tomography, magnetic resonance imaging, or positron emission tomography scan; and blood testing. Psychiatrists use pharmacologic, psychotherapeutic, and/or interventional approaches to treat mental disorders.

Subspecialties 
The field of psychiatry has many subspecialties that require additional (fellowship) training which are certified by the American Board of Psychiatry and Neurology (ABPN) and require Maintenance of Certification Program to continue. These include the following: 
 Clinical neurophysiology
 Forensic psychiatry
 Addiction psychiatry
 Child and adolescent psychiatry
 Geriatric psychiatry
 Palliative care
 Pain management
 Consultation-liaison psychiatry
 Sleep medicine
 Brain injury medicine

Further, other specialties that exist include:
 Cross-cultural psychiatry
 Emergency psychiatry
 Learning disability
 Neurodevelopmental disorder
 Cognition diseases, as in various forms of dementia
 Biological psychiatry
 Community psychiatry
 Global mental health
 Military psychiatry
 Social psychiatry
 Sports psychiatry

The United Council for Neurologic Subspecialties in the United States offers certification and fellowship program accreditation in the subspecialties of behavioral neurology and neuropsychiatry, which is open to both neurologists and psychiatrists.

Some psychiatrists specialize in helping certain age groups. Pediatric psychiatry is the area of the profession working with children in addressing psychological problems. Psychiatrists specializing in geriatric psychiatry work with the elderly and are called geriatric psychiatrists or geropsychiatrists. Those who practice psychiatry in the workplace are called occupational psychiatrists in the United States and occupational psychology is the name used for the most similar discipline in the UK. Psychiatrists working in the courtroom and reporting to the judge and jury, in both criminal and civil court cases, are called forensic psychiatrists, who also treat mentally disordered offenders and other patients whose condition is such that they have to be treated in secure units.

Other psychiatrists may also specialize in psychopharmacology, psychotherapy, psychiatric genetics, neuroimaging, dementia-related disorders such as Alzheimer's disease, attention deficit hyperactivity disorder, sleep medicine, pain medicine, palliative medicine, eating disorders, sexual disorders, women's health, global mental health, early psychosis intervention, mood disorders and anxiety disorders such as obsessive–compulsive disorder and post-traumatic stress disorder.

Psychiatrists work in a wide variety of settings. Some are full-time medical researchers, many see patients in private medical practices, and consult liaison psychiatrists see patients in hospital settings where psychiatric and other medical conditions interact.

Professional requirements 
While requirements to become a psychiatrist differ from country to country, all require a medical degree.

India

In India, a Bachelor of Medicine, Bachelor of Surgery (MBBS) degree is the basic qualification needed to do psychiatry. After completing an MBBS (including an internship), they can attend various PG medical entrance exams and get a Doctor of Medicine (M.D.) in psychiatry, which is a 3-year course. Diploma course in psychiatry or DNB psychiatry can also be taken to become a psychiatrist.

Netherlands

In the Netherlands, one must complete medical school after which one is certified as a medical doctor. After a strict selection program, one can specialize for 4.5-years in psychiatry. During this specialization, the resident has to do a 6-month residency in the field of social psychiatry, a 12-month residency in a field of their own choice (which can be child psychiatry, forensic psychiatry, somatic medicine, or medical research).  To become an adolescent psychiatrist, one has to do an extra specialization period of 2 more years. In short, this means that it takes at least 10.5 years of study to become a psychiatrist which can go up to 12.5 years if one becomes a children's and adolescent psychiatrist.

Pakistan
In Pakistan, one must complete basic medical education, an MBBS, then get registered with the Pakistan Medical and Dental Council (PMDC) as a general practitioner after a one-year mandatory internship, house job. After registration with PMDC, one has to take the FCPS-I exam. After that, they pursue four additional years of training in psychiatry at the College of Physicians and Surgeons Pakistan. Training includes rotations in general medicine, neurology, and clinical psychology for 3 months each, during the first two years. There is a mid-exam intermediate module and a final exam after 4 years.

UK and the Republic of Ireland
In the United Kingdom, psychiatrists must hold a medical degree. Following this, the individual will work as a foundation house officer for two additional years in the UK, or one year as an intern in the Republic of Ireland to achieve registration as a basic medical practitioner. Training in psychiatry can then begin and it is taken in two parts: three years of basic specialist training culminating in the MRCPsych exam, followed by three years of higher specialist training referred to as "ST4-6" in the UK and "Senior Registrar Training" in the Republic of Ireland. Candidates with MRCPsych degree and complete basic training must reinterview for higher specialist training. At this stage, the development of special interests such as forensic or child/adolescent takes place. At the end of 3 years of higher specialist training, candidates are awarded a Certificate of Completion of (Specialist) Training (CC(S)T). At this stage, the psychiatrist can register as a specialist, and the qualification of CC(S)T is recognized in all EU/EEA states. As such, training in the UK and Ireland is considerably longer than in the US or Canada and frequently takes around 8–9 years following graduation from medical school. Those with a CC(S)T will be able to apply for consultant posts. Those with training from outside the EU/EEA should consult local/native medical boards to review their qualifications and eligibility for equivalence recognition (for example, those with a US residency and ABPN qualification).

US and Canada 
In the U.S. and Canada, one must first attain the degree of M.D. or Doctor of Osteopathic Medicine, followed by practice as a psychiatric resident for another four years (five years in Canada). This extended period involves comprehensive training in psychiatric diagnosis, psychopharmacology, medical care issues, and psychotherapies.  All accredited psychiatry residencies in the United States require proficiency in cognitive behavioral, brief, psychodynamic, and supportive psychotherapies.  Psychiatry residents are required to complete at least four post-graduate months of internal medicine or pediatrics, plus a minimum of two months of neurology during their first year of residency, referred to as an "internship". After completing their training, psychiatrists are eligible to take a specialty board examination to become board-certified.  The total amount of time required to complete educational and training requirements in the field of psychiatry in the United States is twelve years after high school. The average salary for psychiatrists in the U.S. is $220,000 per year. Subspecialists in child and adolescent psychiatry are required to complete a two-year fellowship program, the first year of which can run concurrently with the fourth year of the general psychiatry residency program. This adds one to two years of training.

See also

References

Further reading 

 
 
 
 

 
Mental health occupations